Italia Glacier is a tidewater glacier located in Alberto de Agostini National Park, Chile. It flows down in a southwest direction to its terminus in the Beagle Channel.

References

Glaciers of Magallanes Region